Papp is a Hungarian surname. It can refer to:

Daniel S. Papp, President of Kennesaw State University
George Papp, American comic book artist.
Gustáv Papp (1919–1997), Slovak operatic tenor
Josef Papp (c. 1933 – 1989), Hungarian-American engineer accused of creating a hoax
Joseph Papp (1921–1991), American theatrical producer and director
Joseph M. Papp (born 1975), American professional cyclist
Krisztina Papp (born 1982), Hungarian long distance runner
László Papp (1926–2003), Hungarian boxer and three-time Olympic champion
László Papp (wrestler) (1905–1989), Hungarian wrestler and 1928 Olympic silver medalist
 (Born 1992), Brazilian actor and playwright
Paul Papp (born 1989), Romanian footballer of Hungarian origin (Pál Papp)
Robert J. Papp, Jr. (born 1952), Commandant of the United States Coast Guard and admiral

See also
Pap (food)
Pap (surname)
Papps

Hungarian-language surnames
Occupational surnames